Blank-Wave Arcade Remixes is the first remix album by the indie rock band The Faint. It was released on May 29, 2000.  The LP was released as a limited edition picture disc with 1,100 copies pressed.

Track listing
 "In Concert (Hot Bulb Mix)"
 "The Passives (Cardboard Square Mix)"
 "Sex Is Personal (ZGA Go Go Mix)"
 "Call Call (Club Mix)"
 "Worked Up So Sexual (Pole Mix)"
 "Sealed Human (The Remix Kills Mix)"
 "Cars Pass in Cold Blood (Trans Mix)"
 "Casual Sex (Heavenly Attraction Mix)"
 "Victim Convenience (Dance To Mix)"

References

The Faint albums
2000 remix albums